Arthrostylis is a genus of flowering plants belonging to the family Cyperaceae.

Its native range is Northern Australia.

Species:

Arthrostylis aphylla

References

Cyperaceae
Cyperaceae genera